Apsaphida is a monotypic moth genus of the family Noctuidae. Its only species, Apsaphida eremna, is found in the US state of Arizona. Both the genus and species were first described by John G. Franclemont in 1973.

References

Cuculliinae
Monotypic moth genera